The Royal Flying Corps brigades were organizational formations of British military aircraft and personnel during World War I that typically controlled several wings.  The air brigade system was introduced into the Royal Flying Corps in late 1915 and initially retained by the Royal Air Force on its establishment on 1 April 1918.  Following the Allies' victory later that year the air brigades were disbanded in 1919.  Subsequently, the RAF was restructured with commands comprising groups and groups comprising wings without the need for brigades.

Origins
Following Sir David Henderson's return from France to the War Office in August 1915, he submitted a scheme to the Army Council which was intended to expand the command structure of the Flying Corps. The Corps' wings would be grouped in pairs to form brigades and the commander of each brigade would hold the temporary rank of brigadier-general.  The scheme met with Lord Kitchener's approval and although some staff officers opposed it, the scheme was adopted.

In the field, most brigades were assigned to the army. Initially a brigade consisted of an army wing and corps wing; beginning in November 1916 a balloon wing was added to control the observation balloon companies. Logistics support was provided by an army aircraft park, aircraft ammunition column and reserve lorry park.

List of Brigades
The following brigades were established (the date of establishment is shown in parentheses):

I Brigade
Established 16 January 1916 at Aire. Disbanded on 5 March 1919.
The brigadier-generals commanding were:
E B Ashmore (1916)
D le G Pitcher (1916–17)
G S Shephard (1917–18)
C T MacLean (1918) – Temporary appointment, not a general officer
D le G Pitcher (1918)

II Brigade
Established 23 October 1915 in Great Britain. Disbanded on 14 September 1919.
The brigadier-generals commanding were:
J F A Higgins (1915–1916)
In abeyance from 15 January to 10 February 1916.  The original II Brigade was re-designated as the VI Brigade on 15 January 1916.  Re-established at Oxelaere on 10 February 1916.
J M Salmond (1916)
T I Webb-Bowen (1916–1917)
J H W Becke (1917–1918)
T I Webb-Bowen (1918)

III Brigade
Established 16 January 1916 at Beauval. Disbanded on 10 March 1919.
The brigadier-generals commanding were:
J F A Higgins (1916–1918)
Charles Longcroft (1918)

IV Brigade
Established 1 April 1916 at Les Alençons. Disbanded in October 1918.
The brigadier-generals commanding were:
E B Ashmore (1916)
J H W Becke (1916–1917)

V Brigade
Established 15 December 1915 in Great Britain. Disbanded on 1 April.1919.
The brigadier-generals commanding were:
J M Salmond (1916)
Disbanded - 9 March to 27 August 1916
C A H Longcroft (1916–1917)
L E O Charlton (1917–1918)

VI Brigade
Established 15 January 1916 with its headquarters at 13 Albemarle Street, Piccadilly, London. On establishment, it comprised the assets of the II Brigade.  It ceased to exist on 20 July 1916 when its assets were re-designated as the Training Brigade. The Brigade was re-established on 12 October 1917 when the Home Defence Brigade was retitled as the VI (Home Defence) Brigade. It finally ceased to exist on 9 July 1919 when it was reduced to wing strength and re-designated as the Home Defence Wing.
The brigadier-generals commanding were:
J F A Higgins (1916)
J M Salmond (1916)
In abeyance from 20 July 1916 to 12 October 1917
T C R Higgins (1917)

Middle East Brigade
The Middle East Brigade was established on 1 July 1916 with its headquarters at Cairo.  It ceased to exist on 5 October 1917 when it was upgraded to divisional status and retitled HQ RFC Middle East.
The brigadier-general commanding was:
W G H Salmond (1916–1917)

RFC Cadet Brigade
Formed on 3 September 1917 at Hastings, it was re-designated the RAF Cadet Brigade on 1 April 1918. Succeeded by the RAF (Cadet) College at Cranwell on 1 November 1919. The RFC/RAF Cadet Brigade's commander was:
A C Critchley (1917-18)

Palestine Brigade
Palestine Brigade (5 October 1917). The brigadier-general commanding was:
Direct command of GOC, RFC Middle East
A E Borton (1917–1918)

VII Brigade
The VII Brigade was established in October 1917. It was disbanded on 26 March 1918. The brigadier-generals commanding were:
T I Webb-Bowen (1917–1918)
C L Lambe (1918)

Training Brigade (Middle East)
Established at Heliopolis on 14 December 1917. On 18 March 1920, the brigade was redesignated the Egyptian Group.  The brigadier-general commanding was:
P L W Herbert (1917–1918)

VIII Brigade
The VIII Brigade was established on 28 December 1917. It was disbanded on 5 March 1919. The brigadier-general commanding was:
C L N Newall (1917–1918)

IX Brigade
The IX Brigade was established on 6 March 1918 and disbanded on 8 August 1919. The brigadier-general commanding was:
R E T Hogg (1918)

Training Brigade
The brigadier-general commanding was:
J M Salmond (1916–1917)

Home Defence Brigade
The Home Defence Brigade was formed at Adastral House, London on 15 August 1917 by re-designating the Home Defence Group as a brigade.  Less than two months later, the brigade received a "boilerplate" number and became the 6th (Home Defence) Brigade on 12 October 1917.  The brigadier-general commanding was:
J F A Higgins (1917)

Eastern Training Brigade
The brigadier-generals commanding were:
R E T Hogg (1917–1918)
C F De S Murphy (1918)

Northern Training Brigade
The brigadier-generals commanding were:
P L W Herbert (1917)
R R Smith-Barry (1918)

Southern Training Brigade
Formed at Salisbury on 5 August 1917 within the Royal Flying Corps's Training Division, it ceased to exist as a brigade on 1 April 1918 when it was re-designated as No. 7 Group.  The Southern Training Brigade's only brigadier-general commanding was:
H C T Dowding (1917–1918)

X Brigade
Established as part of the Royal Air Force on 18 June 1918 at Basse Boulogne. It was disbanded on 1 March 1919. The brigadier-general commanding was:
E R Ludlow-Hewitt (1918)

XI Brigade
Established as part of the Royal Air Force on 29 September 1918 at Hurst Park. Although intended for service as part of the Independent Force in France, the armistice came before it was deployed and the XI Brigade was disbanded on or about 15 November 1918.  Its commander was:
 Brigadier-General C L Courtney

References

Royal Flying Corps
Army aviation brigades